The Jabukovac killings occurred July 27, 2007, when Nikola Radosavljević killed 9 people and wounded 5 in the Serbian village of Jabukovac.

Shooting
On July 27, 2007, Radosavljević had lunch with his wife in Jabukovac. She came from Vienna that day. During lunch at 17:00 they quarreled. Radosavlevich hit his wife, broke her nose and jaw and she fell to the floor at the table. After the attack on his wife, he jumped into a well near his house. A neighbor heard strange noises from the well and pulled him out of the well. He then went to his house and took a shotgun that belonged to his father. He told his neighbor to go home or he would shoot him. The neighbor ran away from him. Radosavlevich left his yard covered in blood and with a gun in his hand. He took a dirt road and took to the streets of the Albanian monument. He stopped at a fence on the border with a neighbor's yard. Through a hole in the fence he shot and killed an old woman, she was in the yard. After the shots, two men, a father and a son, left the house and he also shot them and killed them both. He walked further down the street. A married couple was standing in another yard. He shot the man first. The woman started running away but he shot her in the back. After the shots, the old woman went out into the yard and he shot her. She was injured. He went down the street and shot a teenager who was standing in his yard. The teenager's father ran out of the house and bent over his body, and Radosavlevich shot him in the back. He walked further down the street and saw a fleeing man. He shot him in the back and killed him. He went to his brother's mother-in-law's house. In another yard, he shot a woman who was washing. He also wounded an old man on the street. He shot the last victim (his brother's mother-in-law, whom he accused of enchanting himself) in her house. During the shooting, he aimed his rifle at the woman's chest and asked in Wallachian if she practiced magic. She said no, and he walked away from her. Also during the shooting, he spared the guy who was hiding behind the trailer. Then he went to the cemetery. At around 2 am, police found him near his parents' grave. He shot himself in the stomach and was arrested afterwards.

Perpetrator
Nikola Radosavljević was a 39-year-old seasonal agricultural worker in Austria who returned to Serbia before the shooting. As a child, he lost his sister, which affected him for a long time. He also lost his newborn daughter. He had a father, Petar, a mother, Zora, a wife, Jelena, a son, Dalibor (13), and a daughter, Gordana (12). He had a brother who also worked in Austria. Neighbors described him as a kind and calm man who never quarreled with his family and neighbors.

His first attack was in 2006, when attacked several people on a bus en route from Austria to Serbia. After that, his brother and wife took him to the Laza Lazarević Institute for Neuropsychiatric Diseases in Belgrade. He was hospitalized there on May 14; his family released him the next day. He was then taken to a mental hospital in the Austrian city of Klosterneuburg and was released 3 weeks later. Doctors determined that he had acute paranoid psychosis; he felt threatened and constantly thought that someone wanted to harm him, which was accompanied by some delusional thoughts about a curse.

After some time, he stopped taking his medication and attacked his coworker in Austria in October, whereupon he was sent back to the hospital. Some time before the shooting, his farm with a forest burned down, which greatly concerned him. He was also haunted by the idea that his brother's wife and his wife's mother had cursed him (his brother's wife, Anika Kogić, was the last victim of the shooting), and that he was under the influence of that curse. Two days before the shooting, he and his son went to a local sorcerer, who confirmed that he was under the influence of a curse. He also gave Nikola a means of removing the curse from his system. His wife and father found incense and a spoon in his house and suspected that he was using them to get rid of the curse.

After the shooting, he was sent to a mental hospital in Belgrade. Doctors concluded that at the time of the crime, he could not understand the significance of what he was doing or control his actions. A team of neuropsychiatric experts found that he had acute paranoid psychosis, with a sense of threat and constantly thinking about how someone wanted to harm him. He was not convicted but sent to Belgrade Central Prison Hospital for treatment. His wife remarried and did not return to Jabukovac.

As of 2021, he is in the Special Psychiatric Hospital "Upper Toponika" near Niš.

In culture
The TV series Black Wedding is inspired by this event.

See also
Gun politics in Serbia
Velika Ivanča shooting
Žitište shooting

References

External links
САЈ хапшење деветоструког убице
Dosije KRIK
RETRO TV - B92, 28.07.2007, 18:30 (Višestruko ubistvo u Jabukovcu - uznemirujući snimci)

Massacres in Serbia
Spree shootings in Serbia
Deaths by firearm in Serbia
People murdered in Serbia
Massacres in 2007
July 2007 events in Europe
2007 mass shootings in Europe
2007 murders in Serbia
21st-century mass murder in Europe
Negotin